Vallorcine is a commune in the Haute-Savoie department in the Auvergne-Rhône-Alpes region in southeastern France. In 2018, it had a population of 404.

Geography
Vallorcine is located in the Valley of the L'Eau Noire between the Col des Montets and the Swiss border.

It is the terminus of the Saint-Gervais–Vallorcine railway on the route between Saint-Gervais-les-Bains in France and Martigny in Switzerland; it is served by a railway station where passengers must change between French and Swiss trains. In the Swiss direction, the line continues to Le Châtelard where it joins the Martigny–Châtelard Railway which is partially rack-operated.

There is a small museum at Barberine next to the Swiss border and there is a tourist information office and a post office near the railway station.

Le Buet
Within the commune is the small settlement of Le Buet, which also has its own railway station; it is the location of the spectacular Cascade de Bérard, which has a viewing gallery that enters the gorge of the main waterfall. Further up this valley is the Aiguilles Rouges National Nature Reserve and the Nature Reserve of Vallon de Bérard.

Skiing
The community was transformed in 2004 with the construction of a high-speed gondola lift which allowed access to the established Domaine de Balme and La Tour ski areas. This gave rise to the construction of a selection of restaurants and ski accommodation.

Émosson Dam
Although the Émosson Dam for hydroelectric power generation is physically just over the Swiss border, water from the reservoir crosses the border to first power the 189 MW Vallorcine Power Station just over the border in Vallorcine. Water is then sent through a headrace tunnel to the 162 MW La Bâtiaz Power Station,  to the east in Martigny, Switzerland.

Demography

See also
 Communes of the Haute-Savoie department
 Le Buet
 Lac d'Émosson

References

Communes of Haute-Savoie